The 2007 FIS Ski Jumping Grand Prix was the 14th Summer Grand Prix season in ski jumping on plastic. The season began on 11 August 2007 in Hinterzarten, Germany and ended on 6 October 2007 in Klingenthal.

Other competitive circuits this season included the World Cup and Continental Cup.

Calendar

Men

Men's team

Standings

Overall

Nations Cup

Four Nations Grand Prix

References

Grand Prix
FIS Grand Prix Ski Jumping